The 2011 Florida State Seminoles football team represented Florida State University in the 2011 NCAA Division I FBS college football season. The Seminoles were led by second-year head coach Jimbo Fisher and played their home games at Doak Campbell Stadium. They were members of the Atlantic Coast Conference, playing in the Atlantic Division.

Despite starting the season with  a 2–3 record, the Seminoles finished the season 9–4, 5–3 in ACC play, to finish in a tie for second place in the Atlantic Division. They were invited to the Champs Sports Bowl where they defeated Notre Dame.

Previous season
Florida State ended the 2010 season with a 10–4 record (6–2 in the ACC) and were ranked #16 in the final Coaches Poll. They were led by head coach Jimbo Fisher in his first year of head coaching. The Seminoles lost three starters on offense (QB Christian Ponder, OG Rodney Hudson, and C Ryan McMahon) and three on defense (DE Marcus White, LB Mister Alexander, and LB Kendall Smith).

Coaching staff

Rankings

Statistics

Scores by quarter (all opponents)

Scores by quarter (ACC opponents)

Schedule

Awards

Watchlists

 Nigel Bradham
Chuck Bednarik Award watchlist
Bronko Nagurski Trophy watchlist
Butkus Award watchlist
Lombardi Award watchlist
 Andrew Datko
Lombardi Award watchlist
Outland Trophy watchlist
 Dustin Hopkins
Lou Groza Award finalist
 Brandon Jenkins
Chuck Bednarik Award watchlist
Bronko Nagurski Trophy watchlist
Walter Camp Award watchlist
Lombardi Award watchlist
 EJ Manuel
Maxwell Award watchlist
Davey O'Brien Award watchlist
 Greg Reid
Chuck Bednarik Award watchlist
Jim Thorpe Award watchlist
 Xavier Rhodes
Chuck Bednarik Award watchlist
Bronko Nagurski Trophy watchlist

Players

 Brandon Jenkins
Second-team All-ACC
 Dustin Hopkins
First-team All-ACC
 Lamarcus Joyner
Second-team All-ACC
 Shawn Powell
First-team All-ACC
Consensus All-American
 Zebrie Sanders
First-team All-ACC

Roster

Depth chart

Recruits

References

Florida State
Florida State Seminoles football seasons
Cheez-It Bowl champion seasons
Florida State Seminoles football